Maksinskaya is a rural locality (a village) in Nikolskoye Rural Settlement, Kaduysky District, Vologda Oblast, Russia. The population was 8 as of 2002.

Geography 
Maksinskaya is located 40 km north of Kaduy (the district's administrative centre) by road. Lebenets is the nearest rural locality.

References 

Rural localities in Kaduysky District